Robert Loe (born 5 August 1991) is a New Zealand professional basketball player for the New Zealand Breakers of the National Basketball League (NBL). He played college basketball for Saint Louis University and represents the New Zealand national team. He holds a British passport which allows him to play as an unrestricted player in Europe.

Early life
Born in Leicester, England, Loe grew up in Auckland, New Zealand where he attended Westlake Boys High School. At Westlake, he helped the team win two national championships and was a Westlake Sportsman of the Year recipient after averaging 19.5 points, 12.3 rebounds and 3.7 assists while shooting 63 percent from the field. He also earned the ASB college sport Sportsman of the Year award in 2009 and the ASB college sport Basketballer of the Year award in 2008 and 2009, while being named Westlake's most outstanding basketball player three years in a row. In April 2010, he was a member of the World Select Team that competed at the Nike Hoop Summit in Portland, Oregon.

College career
As a freshman at Saint Louis in 2010–11, Loe averaged 6.7 points and 3.5 rebounds per game while playing in all but one game for the Billikens. He drew 18 starting assignments and was third on the squad with 20 blocks, the seventh-most by a freshman at SLU.

As a sophomore in 2011–12, Loe was one of three Billikens to start every game. He finished third on the squad with 34 made three-pointers, and blocked 17 shots during the season to rank third on the team. He averaged 5.2 points and 2.9 rebounds per game while helping the Billikens reach the 2012 NCAA Tournament.

As a junior in 2012–13, Loe was one of three Billikens to start all 35 games. He averaged 7.0 points and 3.4 rebounds, and tied for third on the squad with 29 made three-pointers.

As a senior in 2013–14, Loe started all 34 games for the Billikens. He finished third on the team in scoring with 10.3 points, led the team in blocked shots with 41 (the 10th-most in a single season at SLU), and his 88 career blocked shots finished eighth all-time at SLU. On 1 February 2014, he scored a career-high 23 points in an 87–81 overtime win over George Mason.

College statistics

|-
| style="text-align:left;"| 2010–11
| style="text-align:left;"| Saint Louis
| 30 || 18 || 17.5 || .389 || .337 || .606 || 3.5 || .8 || .5 || .7 || 6.7
|-
| style="text-align:left;"| 2011–12
| style="text-align:left;"| Saint Louis
| 34 || 34 || 16.3 || .417 || .351 || .630 || 2.9 || .6 || .4 || .5 || 5.2
|-
| style="text-align:left;"| 2012–13
| style="text-align:left;"| Saint Louis
| 35 || 35 || 22.9 || .419 || .315 || .690 || 3.4 || 1.2 || .4 || .3 || 7.0
|-
| style="text-align:left;"| 2013–14
| style="text-align:left;"| Saint Louis
| 34 || 34 || 27.7 || .453 || .306 || .753 || 5.7 || 2.0 || .9 || 1.2 || 10.3
|-
| style="text-align:center;" colspan="2"|Career
| 133 || 121 || 21.2 || .423 || .326 || .696 || 3.9 || 1.2 || .6 || .7 || 7.3
|-

Professional career

Greece (2014–2015)
After going undrafted in the 2014 NBA draft, Loe joined the Golden State Warriors for the 2014 NBA Summer League. On 9 September 2014, he signed with Greek team KAOD for the 2014–15 season. On 7 February 2015, he scored a season-high 22 points in KAOD's win over Rethymno Aegean. In 26 games for KAOD, he averaged 7.3 points, 4.8 rebounds and 1.2 assists per game.

Belgium (2015–2016)
On 26 July 2015, Loe signed with Belgian club Limburg United for the 2015–16 season. On 17 December 2015, he was ruled out for eight to ten weeks with a knee injury. He returned to action on 4 March 2016 and played out the rest of the season. In 27 games for Limburg, he averaged 7.1 points, 3.4 rebounds and 1.5 assists per game.

New Zealand Breakers (2016–2018)
On 17 June 2016, Loe signed with the New Zealand Breakers for the 2016–17 NBL season. On 2 December 2016, he scored a season-high 21 points in a 95–91 loss to the Illawarra Hawks. In 26 games for the Breakers in 2016–17, he averaged 7.1 points, 3.4 rebounds and 1.9 assists per game.

On 28 March 2017, Loe re-signed with the Breakers for the 2017–18 season. On 21 December 2017, he scored a career-high 24 points in a 99–95 win over the Sydney Kings. He appeared in all 30 games for the Breakers in 2017–18, averaging 7.2 points, 4.4 rebounds and 1.1 assists per game.

Cairns Taipans (2018–2019)
On 24 April 2018, Loe signed a two-year deal with the Cairns Taipans. On 5 April 2019, he was released from the second year of his contract per his request.

New Zealand and Japan (2019–present)
On 31 March 2019, Loe signed with the Wellington Saints for the 2019 New Zealand NBL season.

On 7 May 2019, Loe signed a one-year deal with the New Zealand Breakers, returning to the club for a second stint. In October 2019, he sustained a skull fracture during a game which required hospitalisation. Following the 2019–20 NBL season, Loe joined the Kagawa Five Arrows of the Japanese B.League. However, he cut his stint short after just two games in order to return to the New Zealand due to the COVID-19 pandemic.

On 16 February 2020, Loe re-signed with the Breakers on a three-year deal. On 18 February 2021, he left the team, who were stationed in Australia during the 2020–21 NBL season, to return to New Zealand for personal reasons. He re-joined the team in April for the rest of the season.

Loe had off-season knee surgery in 2021. In January 2022, he played his 100th game for the Breakers, becoming the 16th player in team history to reach the milestone. He fell out of favour with coach Dan Shamir during the 2021–22 season, becoming the squad's third-string centre. On 15 April, just hours after the Breakers parted ways with starting centre Yanni Wetzell, Loe scored a career-high 27 points in an 88–86 loss to the Tasmania JackJumpers.

Loe played for the Auckland Tuatara in the 2022 New Zealand NBL season and helped them reach the grand final.

Loe re-joined the Breakers for the 2022–23 NBL season and helped them reach the grand final series. He is set to re-join the Tuatara for the 2023 New Zealand NBL season.

National team career
Loe competed for the New Zealand junior national team as a 17-year-old at the 2009 FIBA Under-19 World Championship held in New Zealand. Although the Junior Tall Blacks struggled to a disappointing 13th-place finish, Loe led the team with 18.8 points and seven rebounds per game.

On the heels of his strong performance at the Under-19 championship, Loe was selected to the senior national team for the first time at the 2009 FIBA Oceania Championship. At only 18 years of age, Loe was the youngest player in the tournament, and saw action off the bench in both games against Australia.

In June 2012, he was named to the Tall Blacks roster for the 2012 FIBA World Olympic Qualifying Tournament. In August 2014, he was named to the Tall Blacks roster for the 2014 FIBA Basketball World Cup.

After helping lead the Tall Blacks to the 2015 Stanković Cup title, Loe played in the two-game FIBA Oceania Championship series against Australia in mid-August. New Zealand were defeated 2–0 as Loe recorded a total of 10 points over the two games.

Personal life
Loe and his wife Kelly have a son.

References

External links
NBL profile
Belgian League profile
SLU Billikens bio

1991 births
Living people
2014 FIBA Basketball World Cup players
2019 FIBA Basketball World Cup players
Auckland Tuatara basketball players
Basketball players at the 2018 Commonwealth Games
Cairns Taipans players
Commonwealth Games bronze medallists for New Zealand
Commonwealth Games medallists in basketball
Centers (basketball)
K.A.O.D. B.C. players
Kagawa Five Arrows players
Limburg United players
New Zealand men's basketball players
New Zealand Breakers players
New Zealand expatriate basketball people in Australia
New Zealand expatriate basketball people in Belgium
New Zealand expatriate basketball people in Greece
New Zealand expatriate basketball people in Japan
New Zealand expatriate basketball people in the United States
People educated at Westlake Boys High School
Power forwards (basketball)
Saint Louis Billikens men's basketball players
Wellington Saints players
Medallists at the 2018 Commonwealth Games